Vahum is a 2004 Maldivian horror Television film directed by Mohamed Shiyaz. Produced by Television Maldives, the film stars Niuma Mohamed and Lufshan Shakeeb in pivotal roles.

Premise
Muna (Niuma Mohamed), an ambitious young woman relocates to her husband's house after their marriage. Soon after, Muna experiences strange incidents in the house which her husband, Amir (Lufshan Shakeeb) takes lightly with a humor. To her surprise, everyone whom Muna meets in the island questions her on how well she knows about her husband and advice to be cautious while staying in the house. She meets an insane woman, Sakeena (Neena Saleem) who reveals a big revelation with regard to Amir's past relationships.

Cast 
 Niuma Mohamed as Muna
 Lufshan Shakeeb as Amir Idrees
 Chilhiya Moosa Manik as Moosa
 Neena Saleem as Sakeena
 Husnee as Husnee
 Sheereen Abdul Wahid as Sheereen

References

External links
 

2004 television films
2004 films
Maldivian television films